The Suzhou Ladies Open is a tournament for professional female tennis players played on outdoor hard courts. The event is classified as a $100,000 ITF Women's Circuit tournament. It has been held in Suzhou, China, since 2012. It was part of the WTA 125K series from 2013 to 2014.

Past finals

Singles

Doubles

External links 
 WTA tournament profile page
 ITF search

 
WTA 125 tournaments
ITF Women's World Tennis Tour
Hard court tennis tournaments
Tennis tournaments in China
Recurring sporting events established in 2012